Élodie Yung (born 22 February 1981) is a French  actress. She is best known for her role as Elektra Natchios in the 2016 second season of the Marvel Cinematic Universe Netflix series Daredevil and the 2017 Netflix miniseries The Defenders, as well as Thony De La Rosa on the 2022 Fox series The Cleaning Lady.

Early life
Yung was born in Paris, on 22 February 1981. Her father is Cambodian and her mother is French. She grew up in Seine-Saint-Denis. Her father enrolled her in karate classes at age 9, and she eventually became a black belt in her late teens. Yung earned a law degree at the University of Paris with the intention of becoming a judge. However, at the age of 29, she instead pursued acting at the London Academy of Music and Dramatic Art.

Career
Yung's first roles were on TV after she started receiving acting role proposals when she was 20 years old. Yung returned to TV for the first three seasons of the successful police series Les Bleus with Clémentine Célarié. Yung appeared in the 2011 film The Girl with the Dragon Tattoo as Miriam Wu, a romantic interest of Lisbeth Salander. In 2013, she appeared on the silver screen as the ninja Jinx in G.I. Joe: Retaliation. She starred in the film Gods of Egypt (2016), as the goddess Hathor. In 2016 she starred as Amelia Roussel in the action comedy The Hitman's Bodyguard alongside Ryan Reynolds and Samuel L. Jackson. She plays Elektra in season 2 of Daredevil in 2016, and reprised the role in 2017 in The Defenders. In 2020, Yung played the role of Catherine in the Disney+ film Secret Society of Second-Born Royals. In 2022, Yung began starring as Thony in the Fox crime drama series The Cleaning Lady.

Personal life
In June 2018, Yung announced she was pregnant with her first child. Her daughter with actor Jonathan Howard was born early August 2018.

Filmography

Film

Television

Video games

References

External links

 
 
 Élodie Yung on Moviie.com
 Élodie Yung on vote model ranking

1981 births
Living people
21st-century French actresses
Actresses from Paris
Alumni of the London Academy of Music and Dramatic Art
College of Sorbonne alumni
French film actresses
French female karateka
French people of Cambodian descent
French television actresses
Sportspeople from Paris
20th-century French women